| tries = {{#expr:
 + 6 + 3 + 8 + 3 +  5 +  8
 + 3 + 2 + 2 + 6 +  8 +  3
 + 6 + 2 + 1 + 5 +  7 + 10
 + 4 + 8 + 6 + 1 +  2 +  6
 + 6 + 4 + 1 + 5 +  8 +  3
 + 0 + 1 + 3 + 2 +  2 +  4
 + 1 + 6 + 3 + 3 +  2 +  3
 + 5 + 5 + 1 + 4 +  8 +  4
 + 8 + 3 + 3 + 0 +  2 +  1
+ 2 + 6 + 3 + 4 +  6 +  4
+ 4 + 4 + 2 + 1 +  2 +  3
+ 1 + 4 + 3 + 4 +  3 +  3
+ 2 + 4 + 5 + 5 +  5 +  2
+ 6 + 4 + 4 + 5 +  9 +  2
+ 8 + 3 + 5 + 4 +  2 +  6
+ 0 + 5 + 5 + 5 +  5 +  8
+ 4 + 5 + 3 + 4 +  5 +  6
+ 8 + 6 + 2 + 8 + 10 +  6
+ 7 + 5 + 7 + 5 +  5 +  7
+ 5 + 3 + 6 + 7 +  6 +  5
+ 2 + 1 + 3 + 3 +  7 +  1
+ 4 + 6 + 5 + 7 +  5 + 12
+ 2 + 5 + 5
}}
| top point scorer = Ian Keatley (Munster)(184 points)
| top try scorer = Rhys Webb (Ospreys)(12 tries)
| website = www.pro12rugby.com
| prevseason = 2013–14
| nextseason = 2015–16
}}

The 2014–15 Pro12 (also known as the Guinness Pro12 for sponsorship reasons) was the 14th season of the professional rugby union competition originally known as the Celtic League, and the fifth with its current four-country format.

It was the first season to be referred to as the Pro12 to not have RaboDirect as the title sponsor, having been replaced by Guinness.

Leinster were the defending champions having beaten Glasgow Warriors in the previous season's playoff final, to become the first team in the league to successfully retain the trophy. Leinster were unable to defend their title as they failed to qualify for the end-of-season playoffs for the top four teams after the regular season. Glasgow Warriors finished the regular season on top of the table, and were crowned champions for the first time, beating second seeded team Munster 31–13 in the final. Thus, the Warriors became the first Scottish team to win a professional trophy, beating Edinburgh's appearance in the final of the 2014–15 European Rugby Challenge Cup.

The twelve competing teams were the four Irish teams, Connacht, Leinster, Munster and Ulster; two Italian teams, Benetton Treviso and Zebre; two Scottish teams, Edinburgh and Glasgow Warriors and four Welsh teams, Cardiff Blues, Newport Gwent Dragons, Ospreys and Scarlets.

The Guinness PRO12 Trophy is a 60 cm tall piece handmade made by silversmith Thomas Lyte from 8.3 kg of sterling silver, with league branding highlighted in gold plate.

Changes for the season

All countries
With the Heineken Cup being replaced by the 20-team European Rugby Champions Cup in the 2014–15 season, the Pro12 table had a greater impact on qualification. Though the qualification was decided by the league table in the 2013–14 season, teams were not aware this would be the case until April 2014.

Under the previous format, the Pro12 provided a minimum of ten teams, with Scotland and Italy providing two teams each, and Ireland and Wales both providing three. The new system saw one place now being reserved for the highest finishing Pro12 team from each of four participating countries and three other qualifiers based solely on league position, for a total of seven teams. The other teams were entered in the new second-tier competition, the European Rugby Challenge Cup.

Starting in the 2015–16 competition, the 20th tournament spot will be decided by a playoff involving the Pro12's highest-finishing team that has not already qualified, the seventh highest finishing club from France's Top 14 and the seventh highest finishing club from the English Premiership. The play-off was initially planned to involve two Pro12 teams, but that plan was scrapped due to fixture clashes with the Top 14.

Ireland
Connacht entered the season with a new captain following the forced retirement of Craig Clarke due to persistent concussions. John Muldoon was confirmed as the new captain in August 2014. They were also without the playing services of former captain and centurion Gavin Duffy, whose contract was not renewed the previous season. It was later announced that he had taken up a role with the province's commercial team.

Leinster came into the competition without the services of long serving player Brian O'Driscoll, who retired at the end of the 2013–14 season, for the first time. O'Driscoll had played in every previous season of the league. They were also without last year's captain Leo Cullen on the playing field, as he also retired, taking up the role of forwards coach. Irish international Jamie Heaslip was announced as the side's new captain in August 2014, with Rob Kearney and Seán O'Brien serving as his vice-captains.

Following the departure of last year's head coach Rob Penney, who took up a role with the Japanese side NTT Communications Shining Arcs, Munster were coached by former player and previous season's forwards coach Anthony Foley. Foley was joined in the coaching staff by his fellow former Munster players Mick O'Driscoll and Jerry Flannery, as well as Cork Constitution head coach Brian Walsh.

Ulster entered the season with their home stadium, the Kingspan Stadium redeveloped, with the stadium's capacity having been increased to 18,196. In June 2014, David Humphreys left his post as the province's Director of Rugby, joining English Premiership side Gloucester. Later that month, it was announced that head coach Mark Anscombe would also leave the province "with immediate effect".  assistant coach Les Kiss filled the role of Director of Rugby on an interim basis. In October 2014, Kiss returned to his position with the Ireland team, with Neil Doak taking the role of head coach. It was announced that Kiss would return to his role with Ulster on a full-time basis following the 2015 World Cup. In addition to the changes in the coaching staff, Ulster entered the season with Rory Best reinstated as captain, following the retirement of Johann Muller at the end of the previous season.

Italy
Despite threats during the previous season that the team would be pulled out of the competition, Benetton Treviso returned for their fifth season in the league. Following the resignation of Franco Smith during the course of the previous season, Umberto Casellato took over as the side's head coach. Casellato joined the side from Zebre where he had served as assistant coach.

Scotland
Ahead of the 2014–15 season, Edinburgh lost a number of experienced players, including Geoff Cross, Nick De Luca, Greig Laidlaw and Ross Rennie. The departure of Laidlaw meant Edinburgh came into the competition with a new captain, and in September 2014, Mike Coman was named as skipper. Edinburgh's home ground of Murrayfield was resurfaced by the time the new season began, following an infestation of nematodes, a type of parasitic worm. In addition to being resurfaced, Murrayfield was renamed under a naming rights agreement with the BT Group. The deal saw the ground referred to as 'BT Murrayfield Stadium'.

Wales
Beginning in 2014–15, the BT Group became the main sponsor on the shirts of three of the four Welsh teams, sponsoring Newport Gwent Dragons, Ospreys and Scarlets, while Cardiff Blues had their home stadium of Cardiff Arms Park renamed under a deal with the group, which saw it referred to officially as 'BT Sport Cardiff Arms Park'.

Cardiff Blues entered the season under new leadership, with Mark Hammett coming in as director of rugby. Dale McIntosh and Paul John stay on as coaches under him. Hammett joined from New Zealand Super Rugby franchise, the Hurricanes. The Blues were without Leigh Halfpenny, whose departure to Toulon was announced in January 2014.  captain Sam Warburton continued playing with the side as the first centrally contracted player in Wales, having signed a deal with the Welsh Rugby Union in January 2014. It was also announced that, following his recovery from testicular cancer, Matthew Rees would continue to serve as the team's captain.

Newport Gwent Dragons entered the season with a new captain. Former Lions player Lee Byrne took over from Andrew Coombs on his return from Clermont Auvergne and the Top 14. He previously played for rival regions Scarlets and Ospreys.

Like most regions, Ospreys entered the season having lost experienced international players. Ian Evans and Richard Hibbard were among the players to have departed, with the pair joining Bristol and Gloucester respectively. The team also lost experienced player Adam Jones. Jones, who had played in every season for the region since its foundation, stayed within Welsh rugby with a move to Cardiff Blues.

Scarlets entered the season with a new head coach, following Simon Easterby's exit. His replacement was Wayne Pivac, with Pivac joining the region from ITM Cup side Auckland. Scarlets were also without the services of one of the previous season's joint captains Jonathan Davies, who departed to join French side Clermont Auvergne. The side was captained by Welsh international Ken Owens, with Scott Williams serving as his deputy in the role.

Preseason friendlies

Teams

Table

Fixtures
All times are local.

Round 1

Round 2

Round 3

Round 4

Round 5

Round 6

Round 7

Round 8

Round 9

Round 10

Round 11

1872 Cup 1st round

Round 12

1872 Cup 2nd round

Round 13

Round 14

Round 15

Round 16

Round 17

Round 18

Round 19

Round 20

Judgement Day

Notes:
 The 52,762 crowd for the 2 matches, was a Judgment Day and Pro 12 match record.

Round 21

Round 22

Play-offs

Semi-finals

Final

Leading scorers
Note: Flags to the left of player names indicate national team as has been defined under World Rugby eligibility rules, or primary nationality for players who have not yet earned international senior caps. Players may hold one or more non-WR nationalities.

Top points scorers

Top try scorers

End-of-season awards
PRO12 Awards 2014/15 awards:

2014/2015 Dream Team

Notes

References

External links

2014–15 Pro12 at ESPN

 
 
2014-15
2014–15 in Irish rugby union
2014–15 in Italian rugby union
2014–15 in Scottish rugby union
2014–15 in Welsh rugby union